Rolling Thunder is the first solo album by Grateful Dead drummer Mickey Hart.

Although Hart had temporarily left the Grateful Dead at the time he made Rolling Thunder, members of the Dead play on the album, along with a number of other well-known musicians from the San Francisco Bay Area music scene.  Also featured are classical tabla players Zakir Hussain and his father Alla Rakha.  The album contains early versions of two songs co-written by Bob Weir that later became Grateful Dead concert staples – "Playing in the Band", and "Greatest Story Ever Told" (called "Pump Song" on this album).

The cover art for Rolling Thunder was created by Alton Kelly and Stanley Mouse's Kelly/Mouse Studios.

The album was named after the Shoshone medicine man, shaman, teacher, and activist Rolling Thunder, who was a friend of Mickey Hart and the Grateful Dead and whose voice is heard on the first track.

In 1986, Relix Records re-released the album on vinyl, using the original masters and color separations.  In 1989, the album was released on CD on the Grateful Dead label.  It was subsequently re-released by Relix.

Track listing

Side One
"Rolling Thunder/Shoshone Invocation" (Rolling Thunder) – 0:46
"The Main Ten (Playing in the Band)" (Hart, Weir, Hunter) – 7:04
"Fletcher Carnaby" (Hart, Hunter) – 4:14
"The Chase (Progress)" (Hart) – 4:04
"Blind John" (C.J. Stetson, Peter Monk) – 3:48

Side Two
"Young Man" (Hart, Monk) – 2:41
"Deep, Wide, and Frequent" (Hart) – 5:33
"Pump Song" (Weir, Hart, Hunter) – 4:42
"Granma's Cookies" (Hart) – 3:00
"Hangin' On" (Stetson, Monk; arranged by Mickey Hart) – 3:17

Personnel

By track

Rolling Thunder Chant
Mike and Nancy Hinton – marimba
Alla Rakha, Zakir Hussain – rain
The Main Ten (Playing in the Band)
John Cipollina – guitar
Bob Weir – guitar, vocals
Jerry Garcia – guitar, vocals
Tower of Power – horn section
Stephen Stills – bass
Mickey Hart – drums
Carmelo Garcia – timbales

Fletcher Carnaby
Sam Andrew – guitar
John Cipollina – guitar
Robbie Stokes – guitar
Mickey Hart – drums, percussion
David Freiberg – vocals, bass, piano
Tower of Power – horn section
Steven Schuster – flute

The Chase (Progress)
Jerry Garcia – guitar
Mickey Hart – drums
Zakir Hussain – tabla

Blind John
Steven Schuster – flute
Grace Slick – piano, vocals
Mickey Hart – field drum, timpani
Greg Errico – drums
Tower of Power – horn section
Barry Melton – acoustic guitar, vocals
David Freiberg – acoustic guitar, vocals
Paul Kantner – vocals

Young Man
Barry Melton – guitar
John Cipollina – guitar
Robbie Stokes – guitar
David Freiberg – bass, vocals
Mickey Hart – drums
Bob Weir – vocals
Phil Lesh – vocals
Carmelo Garcia – timbales, conga

Deep, Wide and Frequent
Mickey Hart – drums
David Freiberg – bass
Robbie Stokes – guitar
Jerry Garcia – guitar
John Cipollina – guitar
Terry Haggerty – guitar (from Sons of Champlin)
Bill Champlin – organ
Tower of Power – horn section
Carmelo Garcia – timbales, congas
Pump Song
Robbie Stokes – guitar
Bob Weir – guitar, vocals
Jerry Garcia – insect fear
Robbie Stokes – bass
Phil Lesh – bass
Tower of Power – horn section
Mickey Hart – drums, percussion
David Freiberg – piano, water pump
Granma's Cookies
Jerry Garcia – guitar
Mickey Hart – drums
Zakir Hussain – tabla

Hangin' On
Barry Melton – guitar
Robbie Stokes – guitar
John Cipollina – guitar
David Freiberg – bass, piano, viola, vocals
Mickey Hart – drums
Tower of Power – horn section

Production
Dan Healy, Rick Davis, John Wollman, David Freiberg, Mickey Hart – engineers
Phil Lesh, Jerry Garcia, Mickey Hart, David Freiberg, Dan Healy, Stephen Stills – mixdown
Rock Scully – direction
Recorded at Mickey's Barn, Marin County, CA
Mixed at Alembic Studios, San Francisco
Ed Thrasher – art direction
Ron Rakow, Bruce Baxter – photography

Notes

References

Bendersky, Ari. "Mickey Hart Set To Save World Music", Rolling Stone, December 13, 1997

Mickey Hart albums
1972 debut albums
Warner Records albums